Free Ride is an American partially improvised sitcom that aired on Fox starring Josh Dean as "Nate Stahlings", a recent college graduate re-adjusting to life at home with his parents in Johnson City, Missouri.  The pilot episode aired on Wednesday, March 1, 2006 at 9:30 pm and the rest of the series aired on Sunday, after which Fox canceled it.

Cast
 Nate Stahlings — Josh Dean
 Mark Dove — Dave Sheridan
 Amber Danwood — Erin Cahill
 Bob Stahlings — Allan Havey
 Margo Stahlings — Loretta Fox

Episode guide

Season 1: 2006
This seasons viewer count was 7.1 million viewers.

Reception
Common Sense Media gave the show 1 out of 5 stars.

References

External links
 

Fox Broadcasting Company original programming
2000s American single-camera sitcoms
2006 American television series debuts
2006 American television series endings
Television shows set in Missouri
Television series by 20th Century Fox Television
Improvisational television series